Daniel Sandford may refer to:
 Daniel Sandford (Bishop of Edinburgh) (1766–1830), Bishop of Edinburgh, 1806–1830
 Daniel Sandford (Bishop of Tasmania) (1831–1906), grandson of the Bishop of Edinburgh
 Daniel Sandford (British Army officer) (1882–1972), brigadier in the British army who became an advisor to Haile Selassie I of Ethiopia
 Daniel Sandford (journalist) (born 1966), BBC Home Affairs Correspondent
 Daniel Sandford (scholar) (1798–1838), Scottish politician and Greek scholar